Guzmania nubigena is a plant species in the genus Guzmania. This species is endemic to Venezuela.

References

nubigena
Flora of Venezuela